

Events
July 10 - Former leader of the Yellow Henry Gang, "Yellow" Henry Stewart dies of malaria while serving a prison sentence for armed robbery.
September 29 - Michael Hennessy, a cousin of New Orleans police chief David Hennessy, is murdered, possibly by a Black Hand assassin, in Houston, TX.
October 2 – After an altercation at Bill Swan's Fireproof Coffee House saloon, Matt O'Brian wounds his brother and fellow co-leader of the Live Oak Boys, Hugh O'Brian on Gallatin Street. Arrested for the assault, despite Hugh fleeing New Orleans in an effort to avoid testifying against his brother, Matt O'Brian is convicted of "assault less than mayhem" and imprisoned, ending the Live Oak Boys' presence in the New Orleans' underworld.

Arts and literature

Births
Waxey Gordon (Irving Wexler), New York gangster and Prohibition bootlegger
Jake Guzik "Greasy Thumb", "Chicago Outfit" member
May 28 – Santo Trafficante Sr., Tampa Mafia Don
July 19 – Alphonso Sgroia "The Butcher", New York mobster
Joe Masseria (Giuseppe Masseria) "Joe the Boss", New York Mafia Don

Deaths
July 10 - Henry Stewart, Yellow Henry Gang leader
September 29 - Michael Hennessy, American law enforcement officer

References

Organized crime
Years in organized crime